Waiter is a 2006 black comedy film by Alex van Warmerdam. It tells the story of Edgar, a discontented waiter. The film had its world premiere on the Toronto Film Festival on 10 September 2006. It was the opening film of the Netherlands Film Festival, where Waiter received two Golden Calves, for Best Scenario and Best Production Design. In January 2007 the film received a Golden Film. The film is about stagnation of creativity and a take on overbearing of elements in life, it also takes wryly a puck-shot at god and his relation with humans.

Plot
Waiter tells the story of Edgar (Alex van Warmerdam), a waiter with a flair for the unfortunate. His wife, Ilse (Sylvia Poorta) is sick is overly rude to him. Customers at work constantly bully him and his neighbors make his life impossible. Fed up with the way his life is going, Edgar goes to the house of Herman (Mark Rietman), the scriptwriter who invented Edgar and is currently writing his story. Edgar complains about the events in his life that keep getting worse and begs for some positive events in his life, including a decent girlfriend. Herman decides to create Stella (Line Van Wambeke), but soon Edgar realizes that Stella will only complicate his life more. Meanwhile Edgar is pestered by his pushy girlfriend Victoria (Ariane Schluter), who constantly tries to be with him. Driven to insanity by Herman and his obnoxious girlfriend Suzie (Thekla Reuten), Edgar constantly tries to interfere with his story. Herman decides to make the story more extreme and violent and finally ends the story out of desperation with Edgar's death.

Awards 
 Golden Calf for Best Script (2006)
 Golden Calf for Best Production Design (2006)
 Golden Film (2007)

References

External links

2006 films
2006 black comedy films
2000s Dutch-language films
2000s English-language films
Films directed by Alex van Warmerdam
2006 comedy films
2006 multilingual films
Dutch multilingual films
Dutch black comedy films
English-language Dutch films